Schendylidae is a paraphyletic (with respect to Ballophilidae) family of soil centipedes in the order Geophilomorpha and superfamily Himantarioidea. There are at least 47 genera and 310 described species in Schendylidae. Compared to most other families in the suborder Adesmata, this family features a modest number of leg-bearing segments (no more than 87) and limited variation in this number within each species (usually no more than three or four contiguous odd numbers). This family includes the two species with the fewest legs (27 pairs) in the order Geophilomorpha: males in the species Schendylops ramirezi have only 27 pairs of legs, while females have 29, and males in the species S. oligopus have 27 or 29 (usually 29), while females have 31. Furthermore, S. ramirezi is one of only two species in this order in which females have only 29 leg pairs (the other species, Dinogeophilus oligopodus, has 29 pairs in each sex). The genus Schendylops spans an exceptionally broad range, including other species with notably few legs (e.g., S. perditus, with 35 pairs in males and 37 in females) and others with more (e.g., S. inquilinus, with 51 or 53 pairs in males and 53 or 55 in females), all the way up to 87 pairs (in S. caledonica, with 83 pairs in males and 83 to 87 in females), the maximum number in this family.

Genera

References

Further reading

 
 

Geophilomorpha
Centipede families